The 1995 Sun Belt Conference men's basketball tournament was held March 2–5 at Barton Coliseum in Little Rock, Arkansas.

Top-seeded  defeated hosts  in the championship game, 82–79, to win their second Sun Belt men's basketball tournament. It was WKU's second Sun Belt title in three years.

The Hilltoppers, in turn, received an automatic bid to the 1995 NCAA tournament. No other Sun Belt members were invited to the tournament.

Format
No teams left or joined the Sun Belt before the season, leaving conference membership fixed at ten teams.

With all teams participating in the tournament this year, the field increased from nine to ten teams. With all teams seeded based on regular-season conference records, the top six teams were all placed directly into the quarterfinal round while the four lowest-seeded teams were placed into the preliminary first round.

Bracket

See also
Sun Belt Conference women's basketball tournament

References

Sun Belt Conference men's basketball tournament
Tournament
Sun Belt Conference men's basketball tournament
Sun Belt Conference men's basketball tournament